Fort Seward may refer to:
Fort Seward, California
Fort William H. Seward, in Alaska